Aunger is a surname. Notable people with the surname include:

Robert Aunger (fl. 1390s), English politician
Geoff Aunger (born 1968), Canadian soccer player